Hesperia Unified School District is a school district in San Bernardino County, California. Hesperia Unified School District serves the City of Hesperia and adjacent areas in the High Desert of San Bernardino County and covers 140 square miles.  The Hesperia Unified School District provides public education services for kindergarten through senior high school students.  It includes 3 comprehensive high schools, 2 continuation high schools, 3 middle schools, 12 elementary schools, 3 choice schools, 2 alternative schools, 1 adult education school, and 5 charter schools.

Hesperia Unified School District was formed in 1987.  Until that time, students in the area were served by the Hesperia Elementary School District and the Victor Valley Union High School District.

Schools

High schools
 Hesperia High School
 Oak Hills High School
 Sultana High School

Middle schools
 Cedar Middle School
 Hesperia Junior High School
 Ranchero Middle School

Elementary schools  
 Carmel Elementary School
 Cottonwood Elementary School
 Eucalyptus Elementary School
 Hollyvale Elementary School
 Joshua Circle Elementary School
 Juniper Elementary School
 Kingston Elementary School
 Lime Street Elementary School
 Maple Elementary School
 Mesa Grande Elementary School
 Mesquite Trails Elementary School
 Mission Crest Elementary School

Choice schools  
 Cypress School of the Arts (K-6)
 Krystal School of Science, Math, and Technology (K-6)
 Topaz Preparatory Academy (K-6)

Alternative/Continuation schools
 Hesperia Adult School
 Canyon Ridge High School
 Mojave High School
 Hesperia Community Day School
 Shadow Ridge School

Transitional Kindergarten available at the following locations  
 Cottonwood Elementary
 Hollyvale Elementary
 Joshua Circle Elementary
 Juniper Elementary
 Mesa Grande Elementary
 Oak Hills High School

Charter schools
 Encore Jr/Sr High School for the Visual and Performing Arts (7-12)
 LaVerne Elementary Preparatory Academy
 Mirus Secondary School
 Pathways to College (K-8)
 Summit Leadership Academy

See also
 List of school districts in San Bernardino County, California

References

External links
 
 San Bernardino County Superintendent of Schools
 California Department of Education
 City of Hesperia

School districts in San Bernardino County, California
Hesperia, California
School districts established in 1987
1987 establishments in California